Ippey Shinozuka or Ippey Sinodzuka (イッペイ・シノヅカ, ; born 20 March 1995) is a professional footballer who last played for J1 League club Kashiwa Reysol.

Club career
He made his debut in the Russian Professional Football League for FC Spartak-2 Moscow on 4 August 2013 in a game against FC Avangard Kursk.

He left Spartak upon the expiration of his contract in June 2017.

After initially planning on returning to Kashiwa Reysol for the 2023 season after spending the 2022 season on loan at Albirex Niigata, in February 2023 it was announced that his contract at Kashiwa would be mutually terminated.

Personal life
Shinozuka was born in Japan, he has represented Russia at youth level. Due to his father is Japanese and his mother is Russian. He moved from Tokyo to Russia at the age of 16. He married Laura Shinozuka in 2016 and has 3 children.

Career statistics

Club
.

References

External links

 
 
Profile at Yokohama F. Marinos

1995 births
Association football people from Tokyo
Living people
Russian footballers
Russia youth international footballers
Japanese footballers
Russian people of Japanese descent
Japanese people of Russian descent
Association football midfielders
Naturalised citizens of Russia
Japanese emigrants to Russia
Russian Second League players
Russian First League players
J1 League players
J2 League players
FC Spartak-2 Moscow players
Yokohama F. Marinos players
Omiya Ardija players
Kashiwa Reysol players
Albirex Niigata players